Requiem, in comics, may refer to:

 Requiem (DC Comics), a comic book series based on the character Artemis of Bana-Mighdall
 Requiem Chevalier Vampire, a French comics series by Pat Mills, translated and republished by Heavy Metal magazine
 "Requiem", a one-shot tie-in to Final Crisis
 Requiem, a Marvel Comics character and member of the Lost Souls, a faction of the Neo
 The Phoenix Requiem, a fantasy graphic novel by Sarah Ellerton
 Silver Surfer: Requiem, a Marvel Knight's limited series by J. Michael Straczynski
 Ultimate Requiem, a number of one-shots and limited series that marked the end of the Ultimate Marvel line of comics

See also
Requiem (disambiguation)

References